Phaeomycena is a genus of fungi in the family Tricholomataceae. The genus contains five species found in Asia and Africa.

See also

List of Tricholomataceae genera

References

Tricholomataceae
Agaricales genera